John Macey (born 13 November 1947) is an English former professional footballer. A goalkeeper, Macey joined Newport County from Grimsby Town in 1970. He made 194 appearances for Newport before joining Minehead in 1976.

After retiring from playing he set up a successful sports accessories outlet in Newport.

References

External links
Post War English & Scottish Football League A – Z Player's Transfer Database profile

English footballers
Grimsby Town F.C. players
Newport County A.F.C. players
Barry Town United F.C. players
English Football League players
Living people
1947 births
Footballers from Bristol
Association football goalkeepers
Bristol City F.C. players
Minehead A.F.C. players